The San Juan River, also known as Calamba River, is a river system in Calamba, Laguna, Philippines. It is one of 21 major tributaries of Laguna de Bay and is regularly monitored by the Laguna Lake Development Authority (LLDA) through one of its 15 river monitoring stations.

Along with the San Cristobal River, it is one of the two major rivers of Calamba that drains into Laguna de Bay. Its watershed area covers Calamba in Laguna and the municipalities of Santo Tomas, Tanauan, and Malvar in Batangas.

Monitoring and conservation 
In the December 2005 LLDA Water Quality Status Report, the San Juan River was listed as "worse than Class D" with a very low percentage of dissolved oxygen saturation. It also indicated that this status had not improved since the river had last been monitored.

According to the Department of Environment and Natural Resources's Water Usage & Classification for Fresh Water, Class D freshwater is suitable for agriculture, irrigation, livestock watering and industrial water supply class II. "Worse than Class D" means that the San Juan is not usable for any of these functions.

The LLDA's conservation efforts for the major tributaries and watersheds of Laguna de Bay have led to the creation of the Laguna de Bay River Basin Councils, of which the MTSC-San Juan River Protection Fdn., Inc. is particularly tasked with the conservation of the San Juan.

See also
 Laguna de Bay
 Laguna Lake Development Authority

References 

Rivers of the Philippines
Tributaries of Laguna de Bay
Calamba, Laguna
Landforms of Laguna (province)